Spinningdale is a hamlet, in the Parish of Creich, on the north shore of the Dornoch Firth in eastern Sutherland, in the Highlands of Scotland.

"Dale" is possibly from the Old Norse Dalr, meaning 'valley' but more probably from 'Dail' a Gaelic word for meadow or field and commonly found in placenames all over Scotland.  It was referred to as "Spanigidill" in 1464, the pronunciation of which bears a close resemblance to modern Gaelic.

The A949 road, the old A9 before the 1991 opening of the Dornoch Firth Bridge, passes through Spinningdale.

Notable residents 
 James Robertson Justice, British actor, lived in a cottage in Spinningdale for sixteen years from 1954 to 1970.

References

Populated places in Sutherland